Lars-Göran Mikael Arnberg (born 1 August 1957) is a Swedish former footballer who played as a defender. He played a total of 536 games for IK Brage between 1977 and 1993. He served as the captain for the Sweden Olympic team at the 1988 Summer Olympics. He won one cap for the Sweden national team.

References

External links
 
 

1957 births
Living people
Swedish footballers
Association football defenders
Allsvenskan players
IK Brage players
Olympic footballers of Sweden
Footballers at the 1988 Summer Olympics
People from Borlänge Municipality
Sportspeople from Dalarna County